Syria (SYR) competed at the 1997 Mediterranean Games in Bari, Italy. The medal tally was 5.

Nations at the 1997 Mediterranean Games
1997
Mediterranean Games